Zama or Zamá may refer to:

Places
Zama City, Alberta, Canada
Zama Lake, Alberta, Canada
Zama, Kanagawa, Japan
Camp Zama, a United States Army base in Kanagawa, Japan
Tulum or Zamá, Mexico
Zama (Tunisia)
Zama (Turkey)
Zama, Mississippi, United States

Other uses
Battle of Zama, a battle fought in 202 BC between Rome and Carthage
Zama (novel), a 1956 Argentine novel by Antonio di Benedetto
Zama (film), a 2017 Argentine period drama film based on di Benedetto's novel and directed by Lucrecia Martel
Zama Group, a German manufacturer of carburetors

People with the name
Francis Zama (born 1956), Solomon Islands politician
Zama Dlamini (born 1991), South African football player
Zama Habib (born 1971), Indian television writer